A list of films produced in Pakistan in 1954 (see 1954 in film) and in the Urdu language:

1954

See also
1954 in Pakistan

External links
 Search Pakistani film - IMDB.com

1954
Pakistani
Films